The Catholic Church in Fiji is part of the worldwide Catholic Church, under the canonical authority and spiritual leadership of the Pope of Rome.

Latin hierarchy 
Archdiocese of Suva, covers the whole country and has two suffragan dioceses outside the country. They are:  
 Diocese of Rarotonga: For Catholics in the Cook Islands and Niue Islands, which are associated countries of New Zealand
 Diocese of Tarawa and Nauru: It has its base at Tarawa on Kiribati island, and covers Catholics in that island and also those in Nauru republic.

They all partake in the Episcopal Conference of the Pacific (C.E. PAC), which is part of the broader Federation of Catholic Bishops' Conferences of Oceania (FCBCO) ). As most of these countries do not have more than a single bishop, they do not warrant a national Episcopal conferences.

Archdiocese of Suva has a history dating back to 1863 when the Vatican created the Prefecture Apostolic of Fiji Island from the Vicariate Apostolic of Central Oceania. It was made Vicariate Apostolic of Fiji Island in 1887. The Vicariate became the Archdiocese of Suva in 1966.

There is formally an Apostolic Nunciature (papal diplomatic representation, embassy level) to the Fiji Islands but it is vested (as with many South Sea states) in the Apostolic Nunciature in the New Zealand capital, Wellington.

History
Missions of the Marist Fathers were begun in the Lau Islands in 1844 and then in Levuka but were initially unsuccessful. A more successful mission began in Levuka in 1861. Many churches were built by Bishop Julien Vidal around 1900. Relations with Methodist missionaries were competitive, with Cardinal Moran in Sydney debating Protestant speakers on mutual allegations of wrongdoing in Fiji. Australian Methodists protested against the appointment of a Catholic, Henry Jackson, as Governor of Fiji in 1902, provoking counter-protests in Fiji.

Sex abuse scandal
On 13 July 2020, New Zealand's 1News revealed that a year long investigation found that the Catholic Church in Fiji had at least 1,300 allegations of sexual abuse against children. 1News Pacific Correspondent Barbara Dreaver, who was in Fiji just before the national lockdown, spoke with some of the victims of the alleged abuse. Many of these allegations also involved Catholic schools in Fiji. Some of the accused clergy were also originally from Australia and New Zealand before they were transferred to Fiji as well. Dr Murray Heasley from the Network of Survivors in Faith Based Institution also stated to 1News that Fiji was common place for the New Zealand Catholic Church to transfer accused Catholic clergy. Despite Archbishop Peter Loy Chong's claim that there had been no reported cases of clergy abusing children in Fiji, Australian priest Julian Fox, who was later convicted and jailed in 2015 for child sex crimes, was transferred to Fiji in 1999 after Australian police started an investigation against him. It was also confirmed that the church also had knowledge of sex abuse allegations against Fox nine years before he was charged.
It goes back to the late 1900s when the allegation of sexual abuse took place in New Zealand which the suspects were sent into the Pacific without police clearance at that time

Demographics 
There are approximately 80,000 Catholics in Fiji, just under 10% of the total population. The 1996 census revealed just over 75 percent of Catholics to be indigenous Fijians and 5 percent Indo-Fijians, with minority communities making up the balance. The present leader of the Catholic Church in Fiji is Archbishop Peter Loy Chong.

See also 
 List of Catholic dioceses in South Pacific Conference states
 Vicariate Apostolic of Fiji

References

Sources and external links 
 GCatholic – Fiji – data for all sections
 Catholic Hierarchy – Archdiocese of Suva

 
Fiji
Fiji